General Lord William Frederick Ernest Seymour,  (8 December 1838 – 9 February 1915), known as William Seymour until 1871, was a senior British Army officer.

Military career
Born the son of Admiral Sir George Francis Seymour, Seymour served in the Crimean War in 1854 and in the Anglo-Egyptian War in 1882. He became General Officer Commanding South-Eastern District in February 1891, and Commander of the British Troops in Canada in 1898. From November 1901 to 1902, he served as acting Military Secretary in the absence of Ian Hamilton. He became Lieutenant of the Tower of London on 1 September 1902, was promoted to full general on 25 October 1902, and retired in 1905. He also served as Colonel-in-Chief of the Coldstream Guards from 1911 to 1915.

References

|-

|-

1838 births
1915 deaths
British Army generals
British Army personnel of the Anglo-Egyptian War
British Army personnel of the Crimean War
Coldstream Guards officers
Knights Commander of the Royal Victorian Order
William Frederick Ernest